Peter Bonello (born 3 July 1961) is a Maltese windsurfer. He competed in the Windglider event at the 1984 Summer Olympics.

References

1961 births
Living people
Maltese male sailors (sport)
Maltese windsurfers
Olympic sailors of Malta
Sailors at the 1984 Summer Olympics – Windglider
Place of birth missing (living people)